Guido Beelaert (born 17 November 1951) pseudonym Guido van Heulendonk  is a Flemish writer. The Flemish National Television made a film out of his first novel Hoogtevrees ("Fear of Heights").

He was born at Eeklo.

Bibliography
 Hoogtevrees(1985)
Logboek van een narrenschip (1988)
Vreemde vogels(1989)
De echo van de raaf (1991)
De vooravond (1994)
Paarden zijn ook varkens (1995; English "Horses are also Pigs" - awarded with the Gouden Uil for fiction)
Aimez-vous les moules?(1998)
Buiten de wereld (2000)
Barnsteen(2010)
En dan, als ik weg ben (2014)
Niemand uit België (2016)
''De afrekening' (2019)

See also
 Flemish literature

Sources
 Guido van Heulendonk
 Guido van Heulendonk

1951 births
Living people
Flemish writers
People from East Flanders